Lolita "Lolit" A. Solis (born May 20, 1947) is a Filipina talk show host, entertainment news writer, and  talent manager.

Personal life
Solis was born on May 20, 1947, in Manila, Philippines. She grew up in the squatters’ area in Lardizabal, Sampaloc, near National University, where she attended one journalism seminar.

In 2022, Solis was hospitalized. She later shared that she has been regularly undergoing dialysis.

Controversies
Solis has made several controversial remarks about celebrities.

Solis was involved in the 1994 Manila Film Scandal, wherein co-hosts Rocky Gutierrez and Miss Universe Mauritius Viveka Babajee announced the names of Solis’ then-talent Gabby Concepcion and beauty queen Ruffa Gutierrez as Best Actor and Actress, instead of Edu Manzano and Aiko Melendez, who are the actual winners. Another co-host, Gretchen Barretto, later revealed the scam, and accused Solis and Annabelle Rama as masterminds behind it. Solis and six others were charged. Solis ultimately pleaded guilty to the offense of orchestrating the scam.

Filmography

Film

Television

Radio

References

External links 

 

1947 births
Living people
People from Sampaloc, Manila
Actresses from Manila
GMA Network personalities
Intercontinental Broadcasting Corporation personalities

Filipino women television presenters
Filipino television talk show hosts